The 2010 Census defines 360 census-designated places or CDPs within the state of Arizona, with a combined population of 894,461 accounting for 14% of the state population.  CDPs are defined as populated areas that are not organized into incorporated communities.  The names and boundaries of CDPs are defined by the US Census Bureau with the cooperation of state and local officials but have no legal standing.  As such, they may be annexed in part or in whole by adjoining cities and towns, become incorporated as part of a new city or town, or be redefined in a subsequent census.

While many CDPs are small, rural communities with insufficient population to support incorporation, this is not always the case.  Included in this list are large, urbanized communities such as Sun City, a retirement community of 37,499 residents, or San Tan Valley, a large suburb of the Phoenix Metropolitan Area whose 81,321 inhabitants would make it the largest city or town in Pinal County were it to incorporate.

Census-designated places

See also
 List of municipalities in Arizona

Notes

References

Arizona
Census-designated places in Arizona
Census-designated